Normattiva is an Italian government website published on 19 March 2010. It contains the rules of Italian law beginning in 1861.

Institution
The Normattiva was created by two laws:

 
 

These were issued to create a free service for the review of all Italian legislation.

History
The site has been updated over the years. It progressively addressed earlier legislation. 
 19 March 2010, publication of the website
 8 May 2010, legislation available since 1970
 22 June 2010, legislation available since 1960
 28 September 2010, legislation available since 1946
 5 December 2013, legislation available since 1944
 21 February 2014, legislation available since 1942
 3 July 2014, legislation available since 1940
 18 July 2014, list of the main codes
 25 September 2014, legislation available since 1938
 1 December 2014, legislation available since 1933
 2 May 2018, legislation available since 1916
 2 August 2018, legislation available since 1861

References

Law of Italy
Italian websites
Online law databases
Government-owned websites